Alice Elizabeth Stewart (born March 11, 1966) is an American political commentator for CNN. She has worked on numerous Republican presidential campaigns.

Early life and education 
Stewart is originally from Atlanta, Georgia. She graduated from Tucker High School and obtained journalism and political science degrees from the University of Georgia's Grady School of Journalism.

Career 
Stewart began her career as a weekend anchor on the NBC Little Rock-affiliate KARK television station. She began working for Arkansas governor and politician Mike Huckabee as communications director for his first presidential campaign (she also worked for his second presidential campaign until she resigned in 2015).

Stewart joined CNN in 2016, during the election.
In 2019, Stewart became a Harvard Fellow at the John F. Kennedy School of Government.

References

External links

American political commentators
1966 births
Living people
University of Georgia alumni